Those Damn Crows are a Welsh rock band formed in 2014 in Bridgend, Wales.

The band quickly started building a loyal following and gaining traction through appearances at the likes of Steelhouse Festival, and receiving airplay on BBC Radio Wales as well as being declared "Ones to Watch" by the UK's Planet Rock radio station in November 2017 and "New Band of the Week" in Metal Hammer magazine in 2018. The band signed a worldwide, multi-album deal with Nottingham-based independent record label Earache Records on 14 May 2018 and released their debut album Murder and the Motive on 5 October 2018. The album landed at number 5 on the Official UK Rock & Metal Albums Chart and number 5 on the Independent Album Breakers Chart. (The album had previously been released by the band in 2016 as a self-financed project with several different tracks. This copy is highly sought after by fans.)

The band played at the Download Festival in 2019, performing three times over the course of the weekend.

In June 2019 the band were announced as the headliners for the next instalment of Planet Rock Winter's End festival, set to take place in Poole, Dorset in 2020.

On 7 February 2020 the band released their second album Point of No Return, which entered the UK Albums Chart at number 14.

On 28 April 2021, it was announced that they'd play the Main Stage at Download Festival 2022.

History 
The band formed in 2014 in Bridgend, Wales, with vocalist Shane Greenhall, guitarist Ian "Shiner" Thomas, bassist Lloyd Wood and drummer Ronnie Huxford, with second guitarist David Winchurch joining the band soon after. The band's name came from Huxford's father—himself a former musician who played with some of the most famous names of the day, including Shirley Bassey, Dusty Springfield and P.J. Proby—who was feeding the birds in his garden one day when he shouted "Those damn crows!". Ronnie took the idea to the other members and they quickly settled on it as their band name.

Discography 
Albums
 Murder and the Motive (2018)
 Point of No Return (2020) No. 14 UK
 Inhale/Exhale (2023) No. 3 UK

References 

Musical groups established in 2014
Welsh rock music groups
2014 establishments in Wales
Musical quintets
Earache Records artists